Two warships of Sweden have been named Bävern, after Bävern:

 , a  launched in 1921 and stricken in 1944.
 , a  launched in 1958 and stricken in 1980.

Swedish Navy ship names